Royal Francis Butler (born 22 March 1977) is an Australian politician who has been a member of the New South Wales Legislative Assembly since March 2019, representing the electoral district of Barwon as an independent. He is a former member of the Shooters, Fishers and Farmers Party.

Prior to entering politics, Butler was a public servant, working as the Western Region Manager of the NSW Police. He is the senior vice president of Sporting Shooters Australia. He has a master's degree in public administration.

On 12 December 2022, Butler resigned from the Shooters, Fishers and Farmers Party over the behaviour of leader Robert Borsak.

References 

1977 births
Living people
Members of the New South Wales Legislative Assembly
Shooters, Fishers and Farmers Party politicians
21st-century Australian politicians